Lieutenant-General Sir Burke Douglas Cuppage  (1794 – 19 April 1877) was a British Army officer who became Lieutenant Governor of Jersey.

Military career
Cuppage was commissioned into the Royal Artillery in 1812. He fought in the Peninsular War and at the Battle of Waterloo under the Duke of Wellington. He was appointed Lieutenant Governor of Jersey in 1863 and laid the foundation stone for a new Public Asylum there two years later.

Family
In 1828 he married Emily Anne Fouril; they had a son and two daughters.

References

1794 births
1877 deaths
Knights Commander of the Order of the Bath
British Army lieutenant generals
British Army personnel of the Napoleonic Wars
Governors of Jersey
Royal Artillery officers
Place of birth missing